Mathilde Paris (born 14 January 1985) is a French politician of the National Rally who has been a Member of the National Assembly for Loiret's 3rd constituency since 2022.

Paris was born and grew up in Epinay-sur-Seine. She initially worked for the local department of tourism in Chambord before founding an interior design business in Blois. She was initially a member and supporter of the Movement for France before joining the National Rally in 2011. In 2014, she was elected to the first time to the municipal council of Blois and in 2015 she was elected regional councilor for the Centre-Val de Loire region.

In the 2022 French legislative election, Paris contested the seat of Loiret's 3rd constituency and was elected in the second round after defeating LREM candidate Karine Barbier-Beauregard.

References

1985 births
Living people
National Rally (France) politicians
Deputies of the 16th National Assembly of the French Fifth Republic
Women members of the National Assembly (France)
21st-century French politicians
21st-century French women politicians